Chikashi Koizumi (古泉 千樫 Koizumi Chikashi; 1886–1927) was a Japanese tanka poet. After initially working as a primary school teacher in his native Chiba Prefecture, he moved to Tokyo and became a full-time poet. He published in several prestigious poetry magazines, even helping to found both Araragi and Nikkō, before setting up his own poetic society, the Aogaki-kai, and taking on disciples. He died before the society's organ could see print.

Biography 
Chikashi Koizumi was born on 26 September 1886. He was born in Yoshio Village, Awa District (modern-day Kamogawa City), Chiba Prefecture.

His real name was Ikutarō Koizumi (古泉 幾太郎 Koizumi Ikutarō), and he also used the pseudonyms Kosai (沽哉), Suinansō-shunin (椎南荘主人) and Minooka-rōjin (蓑岡老人).

He graduated the Chiba Prefecture Teachers' Training Centre (千葉県教員講習所 Chiba-ken Kyōin Kōshū-sho), and for a time worked as a primary school teacher, before resigning in 1908 and moving to Tokyo.

He died on 11 August 1927.

Writings 
Koizumi published many of his early tanka poems in the Tokyo daily newspaper . When he was 17 he published a poem in Kokoro no Hana, and then in the tanka journal Ashibi (馬酔木).

He was a disciple of Itō Sachio. After moving to Tokyo in 1908, he helped found the important poetry magazine Araragi. He had a close working relationship with the poet Saitō Mokichi.

In 1924, he joined Yūgure Maeda, Hakushū Kitahara, Toshiharu Kinoshita, Zenmaro Toki and others in forming a group to publish a new literary magazine, Nikkō, which was to be purely devoted to Modernism. The following year, he published a personal anthology, Kawa no Hotori (川のほとり). Other collections of his poetry include Okujō no Tsuchi (屋上の土), Seigyū-shū (青牛集), and Teibon Koizumi Chikashi Zenkashū (定本古泉千樫全歌集).

In 1926 he founded the Aogaki-kai (青垣会) and took on students, but before their poetry journal Aogaki could enter publication Koizumi himself died.

References

Works cited 

 
 
 

20th-century Japanese poets
1886 births
1927 deaths
People from Chiba Prefecture